Sebastián Bacale Mbansogo Obiang (born 31 March 1995), known as Sebas Mbansogo, is a Spanish-born Equatoguinean professional basketball player who plays as a point guard for LEB Plata club Real Canoe NC and the Equatorial Guinea national team.

Early life
Mbansogo was born in Getafe to Equatorial Guinean Fang parents.

Club career
Mbansogo has developed his entire club career in Spain.

International career
Mbansogo has joined the Equatorial Guinea men's national basketball team in January 2020.

References

External links

1995 births
Living people
Citizens of Equatorial Guinea through descent
Equatoguinean men's basketball players
Point guards
Spanish men's basketball players
Basketball players from the Community of Madrid
People from Getafe
Spanish sportspeople of Equatoguinean descent
Baloncesto Fuenlabrada players